The Agra Fort - Ramnagar Weekly Express is an Express train belonging to North Eastern Railway zone that runs between Agra Fort and Ramnagar in India. It is currently being operated with 15055/15056 train numbers on a weekly basis.

Service

The 15055/Agra Fort–Ramnagar Weekly Express has an average speed of 35 km/hr and covers 439 km in 12h 30m. The 15056/Ramnagar–Agra Fort Weekly Express has an average speed of 35 km/hr and covers 439 km in 12h 30m.

Route and halts 

The important halts of the train are:

Coach composite

The train has standard ICF rakes with a max speed of 110 kmph. The train consists of 16 coaches :

 1 AC II Tier
 1 AC III Tier
 6 Sleeper coaches
 6 General Unreserved
 2 Seating cum Luggage Rake

Traction

Both trains are hauled by an Izzatnagar Loco Shed-based WDM-3D diesel locomotive from Agra to Ramnagar and vice versa.

See also 

 Agra Fort railway station
 Ramnagar railway station

Notes

References

External links 

 15055/Agra Fort–Ramnagar Weekly Express
 15056/Ramnagar–Agra Fort Weekly Express

Trains from Agra
Express trains in India
Rail transport in Uttarakhand
Railway services introduced in 2015